Matthias Peter Schweger (born 1966 in Vienna, Austria) is a director, writer, and producer for television. As an entrepreneur, he co-founded and managed internationally successful music projects Edelweiss and Bingoboys, as well as music video production companies, and helped launch Germany's first music video channel,  VIVA (German TV channel).

Music career
While working for Austria's national Top 40 station Hitradio Ö3 he met fellow producer Martin Neumayer, and together they created the musical project Edelweiss, a unique cross-over between Austrian folk music and US hip-hop. Subsequently, the ABBA cover "Edelweiss, Bring Me Edelweiss" became a world-wide multi-million selling smash-hit with Warner Music, which was followed up by the Enterprise-spoof album Starship Edelweiss.

In 1991 Matthias Schweger signed another Austrian music project, Bingoboys, with Atlantic Records in New York City. The first single How To Dance peaked at No.1 in the US Billboard Club Play, and was followed by an album The Best of Bingoboys.

Music video career
Matthias Schweger started to direct music videos in 1987 with Bring Me Edelweiss. Together with Austrian music-video pioneers Rudi Dolezal and Hannes Rossacher of DoRo Productions he founded Department M.

Schweger oversaw the creative development process for over 120 music videos, and also taking the director's chair for classics including Edelweiss, Bingoboys, Germanic icons like Nina Hagen, Udo Lindenbergh, Extrabreit, Culture Beat, and the trash-smash Shut up and sleep with me.

Consulting
Schweger was hired to consult Dietrich Mateschitz, CEO and founder of Red Bull. The project Matthias Schweger headed was entitled "Red Bull Network", and included the creative, strategic, and technological planning of a global multi-media network featuring Red Bull Content.

References

External links

Matthias Schweger's blog
Official Website

Austrian television producers
Living people
1966 births